Naokatsu (written: 直勝) is a masculine Japanese given name. Notable people with the name include:

 (1590–1662), Japanese daimyō
 (1563–1625), Japanese daimyō

Japanese masculine given names